Johann Nepomuk von Poißl (15 February 1783 17 August 1865) was a Bavarian composer and intendant.

He was born in the Haunkenzell Castle in Rattiszell, Straubing-Bogen, Bavaria. He died in Munich.

Selected works

Operas 
 Antigonus (1808)
 Ottaviano in Sicilia (1812)
 Athalia, libretto by Johann Gottfried Wohlbrück after Jean Racine (1814/1817)
 Der Wettkampf zu Olympia, oder Die Freunde (1815)
 Dir wie mir (1816)
 Nittetis (1817)
 Issipile (1817/1818)
 Die Prinzessin von Provence (1825)
 Der Untersberg (1829)
 Zayde (1843)

References 

German composers
German untitled nobility
People from Straubing-Bogen
Pupils of Georg Joseph Vogler
1783 births
1865 deaths
19th-century German musicians